Tenspeed and Brown Shoe is an American detective/comedy series originally broadcast by the ABC network between January and June 1980. The series was created by executive producer Stephen J. Cannell and a joint production of Stephen J. Cannell Productions in association with Paramount Television.  Most of the show's creative staff (Cannell, Juanita Bartlett, Gordon T. Dawson) were veterans of the private detective series The Rockford Files, which concluded its run about two weeks before Tenspeed and Brown Shoe debuted.

Plot
The one-hour program revolved around two private detectives who had their own detective agency in Los Angeles. E. L. ("Early Leroy") "Tenspeed" Turner (Ben Vereen) is a hustler who worked as a private detective to satisfy his parole requirements. His partner Lionel "Brownshoe" Whitney (Jeff Goldblum) is an archetypal accountant, complete with button-down collars and a nagging fiancee (in the pilot episode), who had always wanted to be a 1940s-style Bogart private investigator. A running joke was his penchant for reading a series of hard-boiled crime novels, subtitled "A Mark Savage Mystery", written by Stephen J. Cannell (in-universe; Cannell wrote the quoted bits but not a real-life series of actual novels), with Goldblum reading some passages in voice-over. But Brownshoe was sharper than he seemed (albeit a little naïve) and more reasonable than his career path demanded; he had even received a black belt in karate.

Cast
 Ben Vereen as E.L. Turner
 Jeff Goldblum as Lionel Whitney
 Richard Romanus as Tedesco
 Larry Manetti as Chip Vincent

Production
This was the first series to come from Stephen J. Cannell Productions as an independent company (it was distributed through Paramount Television, one of only two such collaborations; the other was Riptide). It is also the only one not to carry the famed Cannell logo on any episodes, having "A Stephen J. Cannell Production" appearing in-credit (the logo was not introduced until 1981, when The Greatest American Hero began airing).

The show had broad similarities to the later television series Simon & Simon and Moonlighting, in that it was a lightly dramatic program with many comedic moments about two dissimilar detectives who attempt to solve cases together. Cannell later recycled the basic idea of Tenspeed and Brown Shoe (a crime-solver on the right side of the law working with and taking responsibility for the rehabilitation of an ex-criminal) as the successful Hardcastle and McCormick.

Episodes

Reception
The show was heavily promoted by ABC at the time it premiered in late January 1980.  The series attracted a substantial audience for its first few episodes (the series was the 29th-most watched program of the 1979–80 U.S. television season, according to Nielsen ratings), but viewership dropped off substantially after that, and the series was not renewed for the 1980–81 season.

Home media
On March 9, 2010, Mill Creek Entertainment released Tenspeed and Brown Shoe on DVD in Region 1 for the first time. Because CBS, who held ownership of the pilot, refused to come to an agreement on its use, MCI revealed in January 2010 that it would not be included on the DVD. However, the full-length pilot is included in the German DVD release.

Awards

Cross-overs
Ben Vereen later reprised his role as Tenspeed on  five episodes of J.J. Starbuck, another Cannell production:
 "The Rise and Fall of Joe Piermont" (1988)
 "Rag Doll" (1988)
 "Permanent Hiatus" (1988)
 "A Song from the Sequel" (1988)
 "Cactus Jack's Last Call" (1988)

References

External links

Stephen J. Cannell's Archive of American Television Interview

1980s American comedy-drama television series
1980 American television series debuts
1980 American television series endings
American Broadcasting Company original programming
American detective television series
English-language television shows
Television duos
Fictional private investigators
Television series by Stephen J. Cannell Productions
Television shows set in Los Angeles
Television series created by Stephen J. Cannell